Wildlife Warriors, originally called the Steve Irwin Conservation Foundation, is a conservationist organization that was established in 2002 by Steve Irwin and his wife Terri, to involve and educate others in the protection of injured, threatened or endangered wildlife. Terri is still involved in the organization as patron and significant advisor.

Objectives 
To protect and enhance the natural environment
To provide information and education to the public and raise awareness of wildlife issues
To undertake biological research
To research, recommend and act in the protection of threatened or endangered species.
To enter into cooperative arrangements with like-minded organizations

Projects 
The Australian Wildlife Hospital & Wildlife Rescue Unit, Australia
Elephant conservation, Asia
Tiger conservation, Sumatra
Rhino conservation, South Africa
Cheetah conservation, South Africa
Grey nurse shark research & conservation, Australia
Whale research, United States
Community Education (international)
Koala research, QLD, Australia
Crocodile research, Steve Irwin Wildlife Reserve, QLD, Australia

Logo 
The logo represents the pugmarks of five endangered animals:
Cassowary
Saltwater crocodile
Asian elephant
Ethiopian wolf
Bornean orangutan
They surround a human footprint.

After Steve Irwin's death 

After the death of Steve Irwin on 4 September 2006, thousands of people from around the world offered their support and donations to the conservation group. On 14 October 2006, Wildlife Warriors executive manager Michael Hornby reported that donations to the fund in the past month had reached $2 million – enough to fund its animal hospital and international programs for six to nine months. The conservationist's one-hour public memorial service, which aired worldwide from Australia Zoo in September, has also been made into a DVD which was released across Australia on 14 October, all proceeds of which are to be used to fund the future of the charity.

Irwin's daughter Bindi Irwin, then nine years old, became the new public face of Wildlife Warriors after his death.

See also 
Steve Irwin
Australia Zoo

References

External links 
Wildlife Warriors
Australia Zoo
News.com.au – Irwin charity braces for donations

Nature conservation organisations based in Australia
2002 establishments in Australia
Wildlife conservation organizations
Steve Irwin